David "Dadi" Barnea (born 29 March 1965) is the current Director of the Mossad, having taken over from Yossi Cohen in June 2021.

Early life
Barnea was born in Ashkelon and grew up in Rishon Lezion. His father, Joseph Brunner (Barnea), fled with his family from Nazi Germany and immigrated to Israel at the age of three. Joseph was a graduate of the Hapoel HaMizrachi Yeshiva in Bnei Brak and joined the Palmach at the age of 16. He fought with the Third Battalion of the organization in Nabi Yusha and Safed and then served as an officer with the rank of Lieutenant Colonel in the Israeli Air Force. He was also a manager at Tadiran. His mother, Naomi, was born on board the SS Patria and worked as a teacher and school principal.

Barnea studied at the Military Boarding School for Command in Tel Aviv, ⁣ and enlisted in the IDF in 1983. He did his military service with the General Staff Reconnaissance Regiment (Sayeret Matkal). He later studied in the United States, obtaining a Bachelor's degree from the New York Institute of Technology and an MBA from Pace University. He then worked as a business manager at an investment bank in Israel.

Career
In 1996, he joined the Mossad. He took a course in collection officers and served in the Tzomet Division, commanding operational units in Israel and abroad. For two and a half years, he served as deputy head of the Keshet Division. In 2013, he was appointed head of the Tzomet Division, ⁣ where four awards on Israel national security were presented to the division he headed. In 2019, he was appointed deputy head of the Mossad. In 2021, it was decided that he would be appointed head of the Mossad.

Personal life
Barnea is married and is a father of four. He has a Haredi brother.

References

1965 births
People from Ashkelon
Directors of the Mossad
New York Institute of Technology alumni
Pace University alumni
Living people